Palazzo is an Italian type of building, any urban building built as a grand residence. Palazzo style architecture is an architectural style of the 19th and 20th centuries based upon the palazzi (palaces) built by wealthy families of the Italian Renaissance.

Palazzo may also refer to:

Buildings
 The Palazzo, an AAA Five-Diamond resort in Las Vegas, operated by the Las Vegas Sands Corporation
 The Palazzo (Hong Kong), a private housing estate in Hong Kong

Places of Italy
 Palazzo Adriano, a commune in the province of Palermo, in Sicily
 Palazzo Canavese, a commune in the province of Turin, in Piemonte
 Palazzo Pignano, a commune in the province of Cremona
 Palazzo San Gervasio, a commune in the province of Potenza, in Basilicata
 Palazzo (Assisi)

People
 Steven Palazzo (born 1970), U.S. Representative from Mississippi
 Brad Palazzo (born 1975), former gridiron football
 Giovanni Antonio Palazzo, 16th-17th century Italian writer
 Loris Palazzo (born 1991), Italian footballer
 Luca Palazzo (born 1987), Italian footballer
 Nicola Palazzo (born 1957), Italian writer

Characters
 Il Palazzo, fictional character
 Kefka Palazzo, main antagonist of Final Fantasy VI

See also
 Palazzo Ducale
 Palazzo pants
 Palace
 Palace (disambiguation)